This is a list of players who have played for Leeds Rhinos (formerly Leeds RLFC).

In 2015, the club completed the task of assigning a unique heritage number to all current and former first-team players, based on the date they debuted for the club. All subsequent players have also been assigned a heritage number, again based on the date they make their first-team debut. Players with honours are listed at list of Leeds Rhinos players with honours.

Leeds have awarded Heritage Numbers for games played during the First World War when formal competition was suspended (entire season 1915–16 to January 1919 when formal competition resumed). These games are not considered to be official matches as they were played on an informal basis, and games from 1917–18 to resumption of formal competition in 1919 were played with 12 players on each team due to a shortage of players. Appearances during these games are therefore not included in formal statistics of player's careers. Seasons with unofficial games only are marked with an asterisk ("*"). Appearances during the Second World War are treated as official games because formal competition continued throughout the war.

Players

References

External links
 
 

Lists of British rugby league players